The following elections occurred in the year 1934.

Africa
 1934 Southern Rhodesian general election
 1934 Southern Rhodesian sweepstakes referendum
 1934 Southern Rhodesian general election
 1934 Southern Rhodesian sweepstakes referendum
 1934 South-West African legislative election

Asia
 1934 Philippine Constitutional Convention election
 1934 Philippine House of Representatives elections
 1934 Philippine Senate elections

Europe
 1934 Catalan local elections
 1934 Italian general election
 1934 Luxembourgian legislative election
 1934 Norwegian local elections
 1934 Portuguese legislative election

Germany
 1934 German referendum

United Kingdom
 1934 Combined Scottish Universities by-election
 1934 Hemsworth by-election
 1934 Lowestoft by-election
 1934 Merthyr by-election
 1934 Monmouth by-election
 1934 Twickenham by-election

United Kingdom local

English local
 1934 Bermondsey Borough election
 1934 Southwark Borough election

North America
 1934 Honduran legislative election
 1934 Nicaraguan parliamentary election

Canada
 1934 Edmonton municipal election
 1934 Ontario general election
 1934 Ottawa municipal election
 1934 Saskatchewan general election
 1934 Toronto municipal election
 1934 Yukon general election

United States
 United States House of Representatives elections in California, 1934
 1934 California gubernatorial election
 1934 Minnesota gubernatorial election
 1934 New Orleans mayoral election
 1934 New York state election
 United States House of Representatives elections in South Carolina, 1934
 1934 South Carolina gubernatorial election
 1934 United States House of Representatives elections

United States Senate
 1934 United States Senate elections
 United States Senate election in Massachusetts, 1934

South America 
 1934 Argentine legislative election

Oceania

Australia
 1934 Australian federal election
 1934 Tasmanian state election

See also
 :Category:1934 elections

1934
Elections